The Java forest skink (Sphenomorphus sanctus)  is a species of skink found in Indonesia and Malaysia.

References

sanctus
Taxa named by André Marie Constant Duméril
Taxa named by Gabriel Bibron
Reptiles described in 1839
Fauna of Java